The Women's 50 metre breaststroke competition of the 2016 FINA World Swimming Championships (25 m) was held on 6 and 7 December 2016.

Records
Prior to the competition, the existing world and championship records were as follows.

Results

Heats
The heats were held at 11:12.

Semifinals
The semifinals were held at 18:56.

Semifinal 1

Semifinal 2

Final
The final was held at 19:11.

References

Women's 50 metre breaststroke